The United States Military has a long history of transgender service personnel, dating back to at least the Civil War. Initially, most such service members were women, who disguised themselves as men in order to serve in combat roles. Many reverted to their female identities upon leaving their service, but others maintained their male identities. In more recent years, openly transgender people have served or sought to serve in the military. The subject began to engender some political controversy starting with transgender servicemembers being banned in 1960 and possibly earlier. This controversy came to a head in the 2010s and was subjected to relatively rapid changes for the next few years. As of 2021, transgender individuals are expressly permitted to serve openly as their identified gender. A brief timeline is as follows:
 From at least 1960 and possibly earlier, Executive Order 10450 was applied to ban transgender individuals from serving in the United States military.
 From June 30, 2016, to January 1, 2018, transgender individuals in the United States military were allowed to serve in their identified or assigned gender upon completing transition.
 From January 1, 2018, to April 11, 2019, transgender individuals could enlist in the United States military under the condition of being stable for 18 months in their identified or assigned gender.
 From April 12, 2019, to January 25, 2021, transgender individuals could not enlist in the United States military had they medically transitioned, and if they had a history of gender dysphoria they could only enlist, under their gender assigned at birth, after 36 months of stability. Currently serving individuals could only serve under their gender assigned at birth.
 From January 26, 2021, onwards, there are no restrictions on military service by transgender individuals. Medical care for transitioning servicemembers is provided by the military and procedures for handling the transition in official records established.

History

Pre-first ban
Many women during the American Civil War disguised themselves as men to enlist as soldiers and fight in the war. During this time, women were not legally allowed to fight, however it is estimated there were more than 400 women who were passing as male soldiers during the war. Many of these female soldiers' true identities were never discovered throughout the time of their service. When enlisting, adult women were often able to pass as younger (teenage) men. The physical examinations were lax, leading to many women able to begin training. There were numerous instances of soldiers' female identities being exposed, usually after having been hurt and sent to a soldiers' hospital. Most often, these women just received medical attention and were sent home. However, in several instances, some women who had been disguised as male soldiers were punished or even imprisoned.

Albert Cashier was born Jennie Irene Hodgers in Belvidere, Illinois. He enlisted on August 6, 1862, and served in the Union Army as a man. His identity remained unknown throughout the entirety of his service and he kept the identity of Albert Cashier for the remainder of his life. It was not until 1911, while working as a handy man, that he was struck by an automobile and fractured his leg. When a physician was called, it was discovered that Albert was in fact born a woman. Shortly after his injury he was admitted into the Soldiers' and Sailors' Home in Quincy, Illinois, where, in his application, he gave his birth name as Jennie Hodgers, and stated that he was born in Ireland on December 25, 1844. At the home, only the doctor knew of his true identity and he was able to continue to live as Albert Cashier along with other patients in the home. When his mental health became too deteriorated for the home to adequately take care of him, he was sent to an insane asylum at Watertown. At the asylum Albert was forced to wear dresses and "accept" the identity he was born with, Jennie Hodgers, until his passing in 1915. Albert Cashier was buried with full military honors.

The first transgender American woman to undergo gender confirmation surgery (in 1952) was Christine Jorgensen, who had previously been drafted into the United States Army to serve during World War II. The surgery made front-page news with headlines such as "Ex-GI Becomes Blonde Beauty" (from the New York Daily News) focusing on her prior military service.

First ban on transgender personnel

According to scholars, since at least as early as 1960, Executive Order 10450 was applied to ban transgender individuals from serving in the United States military.  On May 17, 1963, gender transitioned or transitioning individuals were officially prohibited from the United States military by Army Regulation 40-501. This policy reasoned transgender people were medically unqualified to serve because their mental state was considered unfit.

In the 1980s, the United States military decided to apply medical regulations more forcefully on those who identified as transgender. In the case Doe v. Alexander (1981), which was about a transgender woman who had been rejected from the United States Army Reserve due to having had gender reassignment surgery, the Army defended their policy of denying enlistment to transsexual persons by stating that supporting transsexuals would raise a medical problem in the form of hormone supplements not always being available for such personnel. Leyland v. Orr (1987) was about Air Force member Leyland, a transgender woman, who underwent a gender reassignment surgery before being discharged. The courts ruled this discharge as valid due to the reasoning that Leyland was indeed unfit physically rather than mentally. This judgement was determined by inferring that genital surgery is similar to an amputation surgery, which leaves the individual unable to meet the demands of a soldier.

Barack Obama administration
Under Department of Defense Instruction 6130.03, "Medical Standards for Appointment, Enlistment, or Induction in the Military Services" dated July 2, 2012, candidates for military service should not have "[c]urrent or history of psychosexual conditions, including but not limited to transsexualism, exhibitionism, transvestism, voyeurism, and other paraphilias" which is noted as "not a contradiction of the repeal of 'Don't Ask, Don't Tell'" since homosexuality was removed from the list of psychosexual conditions in DSM in 1973.

In 2013, Captain Sage Fox, who had enlisted in the Army 1993 and taken time off after transitioning to the Reserves in 2012 to undergo sex reassignment surgery, was ordered to  resume active duty, despite policies blocking the service of transgender personnel. After a review, the military concluded that it could not legally discharge her, so Fox was asked to return and serve again as a woman. This made her the first openly transgender person serving in the military. She served for 2 weeks and then she had orders to be placed on the inactive reserve which she believed was due to her gender identity. She was not granted disability but her medical records did not indicate her unfit to serve. In 2016, Obama repealed the transgender ban in the military and Sage Fox was working with the medical board and was expected to be reenlisted.

Palm Center panel
On March 13, 2014, an advisory panel organized by the Palm Center, a research institute based at San Francisco State University, released a report that found no compelling medical reason for placing limitations on military service by transgender individuals. It said DoD rules that prevented enlistment or continued service by transgender individuals were based on outmoded and untenable ideas about their psychological and physical fitness, and it dismissed concerns about the costs of medical care. It said the DoD's policies could be changed by an executive order. The panel was headed by former Surgeon General Joycelyn Elders and Rear Adm. Alan Steinman, a former chief health and safety director for the Coast Guard. It concluded:

At the time, service personnel were still being dismissed for being transgender despite their satisfactory job performance. The dismissal policy was based on outdated medical diagnoses which suggested gender nonconformity was a mental illness. In May 2014, Secretary of Defense Hagel said his department's policy with respect to transgender service should be reviewed "continually". Later in May, the ban on Medicare coverage for gender reassignment surgery, which had been in place since 1981, was lifted in response to a lawsuit filed in 2013 on behalf of Denee Mallon, a 74-year-old transgender Army veteran. With the end of the ban on openly gay service members, Air Force Secretary Deborah Lee James stated the ban on transgender personnel "is likely to come under review in the next year or so" in a December interview.

Also in May 2014, the Williams Institute published a research brief estimating 15,500 transgender people were serving on active duty or in the Guard/Reserves, and an additional 134,300 transgender people were either veterans or retired from the Guard/Reserves. The brief was based on a six-month survey of over 6,000 transgender people in 2008–09 asking (in part) if they had ever served in the armed forces, or had been denied entry because they were transgender.

Policy of Secretary Carter
In February 2015, during his first trip as United States Secretary of Defense, Ash Carter was asked about the service of transgender troops, to which he replied:

Days later, the White House echoed Secretary Carter's support of transgender service personnel.

In mid-March 2015, a doctor and major in the Army’s Medical Corps named Jamie Lee Henry became the first known active-duty Army officer to come out as transgender, and the first and only active-duty service member who has changed her name and gender within the United States military, to her knowledge and to the knowledge of other trans activists. In September 2022, Henry and her wife were indicted on conspiracy charges for allegedly attempting to transfer confidential military medical information to Russia.

Starting in March 2015, the Army, Air Force, and Navy issued directives protecting transgender soldiers from dismissal. The Army issued a directive that protected transgender soldiers from being dismissed by mid-level officers by requiring the decision for discharge to be made by the service's top civilian for personnel matters. The Air Force stated that for enlisted airmen, there was no outright grounds for discharge for anyone with gender dysphoria or who identified as transgender, and that a person would only be subject to eviction from the Air Force if his or her condition interfered with their potential deployment or performance on active duty. Navy Secretary Ray Mabus signed a memorandum directed to the chief of Naval operations and commandant of the Marine Corps stating: "Effective immediately, separations initiated under the provisions of the reference for service members with a diagnosis or history of gender dysphoria, who identify themselves as transgender, or who have taken steps to externalize the condition, must be forwarded to the assistant secretary of the Navy (manpower and reserve affairs) for decision."

In the wake of these directives, in July 2015, Secretary Carter ordered the creation of a Pentagon working group "to study over the next six months the policy and readiness implications of welcoming transgender persons to serve openly". He also stated that all decisions to dismiss troops with gender dysphoria would be handled by the Pentagon's acting Under Secretary of Defense for Personnel and Readiness, Brad Carson. Carson would later resign his position in April 2016 following a February 2016 Senate confirmation hearing where he clashed publicly with Sens. Jim Inhofe [R-OK] and John McCain [R-AZ], but he delivered an implementation plan to allow open service by transgender people for Secretary Carter's review as one of his final accomplishments as acting Undersecretary. Although the working group had a January 2016 deadline to finish evaluating the change, there still was no official policy in place by May 2016, and the Pentagon's acting personnel chief stated it would take "months, but not large numbers of months" to finalize transgender military service policy details.

The American Medical Association approved a resolution opposing the ban on openly transgender troops in June 2015. "Transgender Members of the U.S. Military" were listed as one of the nine runners-up for Person of the Year by The Advocate in November 2015.

The Office of the Under Secretary of Defense for Personnel and Readiness asked the RAND National Defense Research Institute to study the implications of transgender service members, including identifying the health care needs of transgender service members, the effect on troop readiness, and the experience of the foreign military forces which allow transgender members to serve openly. RAND estimated in a report published June 2016 that 2,450 active-duty and 1,510 reserve personnel were transgender. Based on the percentage of transgender people seeking gender transition-related medical treatment using private health insurance, RAND further estimated that 29 to 129 active-duty service members would seek transition-related health care benefits per year, increasing military health system costs by 0.13% of the $6 billion military health system annual budget, at a total annual estimated cost of $2.4 to $8.4 million. Readiness was estimated at a decrease of 0.0015% of total available labor-years due to recuperation, and unit cohesion was determined to be minimally affected. The RAND study focused on the service history of transgender personnel in Australia, Canada, Israel, and the United Kingdom, concluding, "in no case was there any evidence of an effect on the operational effectiveness, operational readiness, or cohesion of the force." RAND concluded that calling for "strong leadership support", providing diversity-related "education and training to the entire force", and developing and enforcing "a clear anti-harassment policy" were key best practices. The report had been completed in March 2016, and transgender advocates had accused Secretary Carter of delaying its release because it found there were few obstacles to allowing transgender troops to serve openly. A copy of the RAND report was leaked to and published by The New York Times in May 2016. The RAND cost estimate agreed with an earlier study by Aaron Belkin, who estimated the annual cost of transition-related care would be $5.6 million. On May 23, 2016, the Department of Defense observed the first LGBT Pride Month with openly transgender service members.

End of the ban

On June 30, 2016, Secretary Ash Carter made an official announcement and published Directive-Type Memo 16-005 (DTM 16-005), declaring:
 Effective immediately:
 [N]o otherwise qualified Service member may be involuntarily separated, discharged or denied reenlistment or continuation of service, solely on the basis of their gender identity.
 It is the Department's position, consistent with the U.S. Attorney General's opinion, that discrimination based on gender identity is a form of sex discrimination.
 By October 1, 2016:
 A training handbook will be developed and published for transgender Service members, commanders, the force, and medical professionals. In addition, guidance will be published for medical care and treatment of transgender Service members.
 Transgender Service members will be allowed to transition gender while serving in accordance with Department of Defense Instruction 1300.28 (also published on June 30).
 "The Military Health System will be required to provide transgender Service members with all medically necessary care related to gender transition, based on the guidance that is issued."
 By November 1, 2016:
 Implementing guidance and a training and education plan will be issued by each branch of the military, including a scheduled completion date.
 By July 1, 2017:
 Training of the force regarding transgender Service members shall be completed.
 The process of accession (entrance to military service, through enlistment, Service Academies, ROTC, or any similar program) will be opened to transgender individuals, provided they meet the same physical and mental fitness standards as any other applicant.
 The initial accession policy requires "an individual to have completed any medical treatment that their doctor has determined is necessary in connection with their gender transition, and to have been stable in their preferred gender for 18 months, as certified by their doctor, before they can enter the military".

The Department of Defense (DoD) Instruction 1300.28, "In-service transition for transgender service members", published on June 30, 2016, provided administrative and medical guidance for currently-serving military personnel seeking gender transition. On September 20, 2016, a commander's training handbook was published by the Department of Defense, along with a medical protocol and guidance to change a service member's gender, entitled "Transgender Service in the U.S. Military". On October 3, 2016, non-active duty service members became eligible for the Military Health System to provide behavioral health care and hormone treatments, but not sex reassignment surgery.

On October 26, 10 soldiers in the United States Army became the first to openly petition for a sex change. Also on October 26, the Department of Defense ruled that any form of discrimination against transgender youth was incompatible with an Executive Order issued by then US President Bill Clinton in the year 2000 which directed federal agencies that conduct educational activities to comply with Title IX of the Education Amendments of 1972 and issued a memorandum ordering military youth schools to immediately comply with the 2000 Executive Order.

On October 16, 2016, the United States Air Force published its official guidance policy for transgender individuals. The policy announced their support of transgender airmen and that any bias against them would not be tolerated. This allowed transgender individuals to openly serve in the Air Force, along with outlawing any discharge or denying reenlistment based solely on gender identity. The policy also provided medical protocol and assistance for any service member that wished to change their identity.

The United States Army also followed suit and issued its guidance policy for transgender individuals on November 1.

On November 7, 2016, the Navy released its official guidance policy for transgender individuals.  The policy allowed any individual regardless of race, gender, or sexual orientation to become a sailor if they can meet Navy standards. Current Navy sailors can transition genders with a diagnosis from a military medical provider stating that the transition is medically necessary for the individual. Policy was adjusted to increase facility privacy and urinalysis protocol. The protocol for physical readiness was unchanged.

On November 10, 2016, 55 sailors in the United States Navy and 48 airpersons in the United States Air Force publicly petitioned for their respective gender confirmation surgeries. On November 29, 2016, the United States Department of Defense Directive 1350.2, the United States Department of Defense Military Equal Opportunity Program, was updated to include gender identity.

Donald Trump administration
On February 25, 2017, the Military Times learned that some time after Trump was sworn into the presidency, Defense Department schools stopped enforcing an October 26, 2016 Department of Defense ruling which had found that any form of discrimination against transgender youth was incompatible with an Executive Order 13160 of June 23, 2000 issued by U.S. President Bill Clinton in 2000 (which itself directed federal agencies that conduct educational activities to comply with Title IX of the Education Amendments of 1972) and issued a memorandum ordering military schools to immediately comply with the Clinton-era order.

In April 2017, President Trump nominated Army veteran and Tennessee State Senator Mark Green as his second choice for Secretary of the Army. Green was criticized for prior remarks he had made before the Chattanooga Tea Party in September 2016, including his statement that "if you poll the psychiatrists, they're going to tell you that transgender is a disease." Green withdrew his nomination in May amid strong opposition to his nomination from LGBT advocates, among others, including Daniel Feehan, Principal Deputy Assistant Secretary of Defense for Readiness under the Obama administration, who said Green's prior statements were of "great concern towards military readiness" and could immediately impact unit cohesion. On May 16, 2017, a letter that was signed by dozens of right-leaning groups pushed for banning transgender individuals from the United States military.

On June 2, 2017, the Department of Defense observed the first LGBT Pride Month since the repeal of the ban on open military service by transgender service members in the US military. The one-year review period prior to allowing accession of transgender individuals was due by July 1, 2017, per DTM 16-005, but military leaders had asked for a delay on the start of accessions, ranging from one to two years. Secretary of Defense Jim Mattis issued a memo to delay the start of accessions for an additional six months, stating the need for "additional time to evaluate more carefully the impact of such accessions on readiness and lethality."

National Defense Authorization Act for Fiscal Year 2018 
The office of Representative Vicky Hartzler (R-MO) provided an estimate of $1.3 billion in health care costs for transgender service personnel, assuming a higher number of active-duty personnel based on the 2014 Williams Institute study, which concluded that approximately 15,500 active-duty and guard/reserve service personnel were transgender, and 30% of them would seek gender reassignment surgery each year. However, an article published in the New England Journal of Medicine argued that, in the Australian military's experience, only 13 troops (out of a total full-time force of 58,000) had sought gender reassignment surgery over a 30-month period; applying that rate to the United States military population gave an estimate of 192 gender reassignment surgeries in the United States military per year. In a subsequent interview, Hartzler stated "our own office did that analysis and we feel very confident in it."

Hartzler first proposed an amendment to the National Defense Authorization Act for Fiscal Year 2018 (NDAA) in late June 2017 which would honorably discharge transgender military personnel serving openly, but withdrew the amendment after Secretary Mattis announced the six-month delay while the effect on troop readiness and lethality were being studied. During the debate on the amendment, Representative and Marine Corps veteran Duncan D. Hunter (R-CA) stated he couldn't imagine showering with "somebody who was a girl and didn't have the surgery to become a man but kept the girl stuff", an argument rejected by Representative Donald McEachin (D-VA), who pointed out that similar arguments were made years ago opposing the integration of the armed forces. "I can imagine, not these individuals, not my colleagues to my right, but a Congress 70 or 80 years ago that said that a certain group of people weren't smart enough to fly airplanes. That they'd run at the first sign of battle. That African-Americans could not serve in the United States Armed Forces. Well, African-Americans proved them wrong. The unit adapted. And I'd suggest that the unit adapt to transgender individuals as well."

On July 13, 2017, Rep. Vicky Hartzler introduced House Amendment 183, an amendment to ban on funding gender reassignment surgeries and medical treatments for transgender military personnel via a new amendment to the NDAA in July 2017, which was voted down 209–214 when 24 Republicans joined 190 Democrats in opposing the proposal. Before the vote, Secretary Mattis called Hartzler to ask her to withdraw the amendment. After the amendment was defeated, Representative Trent Franks (R-AZ) stated "it seems to me, and all due respect to everyone, that if someone wants to come to the military, potentially risk their life to save the country, that they should probably decide whether they're a man or woman before they do that." Attempts by Franks and others to insert a provision banning the funding in the rules governing a Pentagon spending package failed following pressure for attempting to circumvent regular order. Republican House leaders then sought direct internvention from the White House. Chief strategist Steve Bannon encouraged President Trump to deal with the matter now and played a role in pushing Trump to move ahead with banning transgender individuals from the military, despite the ongoing Pentagon review.

Service ban announcement by the President
On July 26, 2017, President Donald Trump announced on his Twitter page that transgender individuals would no longer be allowed "to serve in any capacity in the U.S. Military". According to Politico and a senior administration official, President Trump had always planned to ban transgender individuals from the military and prohibit the Pentagon funding gender reassignment surgeries, but the fight over prohibiting Pentagon funding gender reassignment surgeries had hastened Trump's decision. According to numerous congressional and White House sources, the tweet was a last-ditch attempt to save a $1.6 billion border wall funding provision in the National Defense Authorization Act for Fiscal Year 2018.

Trump was criticized for making statements that contradicted the conclusions of the 2016 RAND study. Political commentator Richard Kim observed President Trump's tweets were "a sop to the far-right evangelical faction" in the House of Representatives led by Hartzler, who had threatened the funding for President Trump's planned United States-Mexico border wall if the military continued to spend health care funds for medical treatment of gender dysphoria.

Due to the haste of the announcement, White House officials were unable to answer questions on how the proposed ban would be implemented, or what would happen to those personnel who were openly transgender. Secretary Mattis was only notified about the announcement on July 25. Similarly, Joint Chiefs of Staff Chairman Joseph Dunford noted his surprise at the announcement, saying that "When asked, I will state I was not consulted" in emails dated July 27, 2017 leaked to BuzzFeed News in February 2018. The New York Times noted that the move also marked "a stark turnabout for Mr. Trump, who billed himself during the campaign as an ally of gay, lesbian, bisexual and transgender people". According to Johnnie Moore, who was present, Tony Perkins, president of the Family Research Council first proposed a ban on transgender personnel in the military at a mid-July meeting held between Trump-Pence administration officials and religious leaders, but the proposal did not receive universal support from attendees. After the president's tweets, Hartzler stated in an interview that "this was the right call by our commander in chief, to make sure every defense dollar goes toward meeting the threats that we are facing in the world ... [T]he entire policy ... is a detriment to our readiness."

The announced reinstatement of the ban was followed by protests in New York City, Washington DC, and San Francisco on July 26, 2017, and a rally was held in front of the White House on July 29. As Trump had not yet outlined specific policy changes, Chairman Dunford announced on July 27, 2017, that "there will be no modifications to the current policy until the president's direction has been received by the secretary of defense and the secretary has issued implementation guidance." Senator Kirsten Gillibrand (D-NY) introduced an amendment to NDAA on July 27, 2017, which would prohibit the involuntary discharge, cessation of health care benefits, or changes in responsibility or position (other than promotion, routine reassignment, or deployment) of transgender troops until sixty days after Congress received the results of the six-month study proposed by Secretary Mattis.

On August 1, 2017, the Palm Center released a letter signed by 56 retired generals and admirals, opposing the proposed ban on transgender military service members. The letter stated that if implemented, the ban "would cause significant disruptions, deprive the military of mission-critical talent and compromise the integrity of transgender troops who would be forced to live a lie, as well as non-transgender peers who would be forced to choose between reporting their comrades or disobeying policy". The commandant of the United States Coast Guard, Admiral Paul F. Zukunft, made a personal commitment to "not turn my back ... not break faith" with transgender service members in the Coast Guard on August 1, 2017. At the time, it was noted the Coast Guard was part of the Department of Homeland Security, not the Department of Defense, and it was not clear how the proposed ban on transgender service members would affect the Coast Guard.

Presidential Memorandum (August 25, 2017)

In late August, a memorandum was being prepared which would require Secretary Mattis to enforce the ban on transgender personnel within six months. Aaron Belkin, director of the Palm Center, criticized the forthcoming memo for imposing a double standard on transgender troops, calling it "a recipe for disruption, distraction, and waste".  On August 25, 2017, President Trump signed a presidential memorandum identifying the guidelines for renewing the ban. In the memo, President Trump stated the ban on transgender personnel in the military will remain effective until "the Secretary of Defense, after consulting with the Secretary of Homeland Security, provides a recommendation to the contrary that I find convincing," ignoring the conclusions of the 2016 RAND study, and further called for a "halt [to] all use of DoD or DHS resources to fund sex reassignment surgical procedures for military personnel", effective March 23, 2018. The memo further required the Secretary of Defense and Secretary of Homeland Security to submit an implementation plan by February 21, 2018. Senator Tammy Duckworth [D-IL] and Representative Nancy Pelosi [D-CA] released separate statements condemning the memorandum; Pelosi stated the memo directed "the Pentagon to hurt and humiliate" transgender service personnel and questioned whether "prejudice, not the national defense" was motivating the action.

Two weeks before sending his directive to the Pentagon, Trump said, "I think I'm doing the military a great favor" by banning trans military members. Representative Donald McEachin (D-VA) was the lead author of a letter to Secretary Mattis on October 10, 2017, requesting records of discussions or correspondence between the White House and the Pentagon that would document or justify that Trump was "doing the military a great favor", including any substantiation of requests for a ban on transgender soldiers originating from senior military or Department of Defense personnel. The letter, which questioned "whether the president, his national security team, and military leaders are actively coordinating policy with one another, or whether the president's transgender ban announcement reflected a breakdown in communication", was co-signed by 114 other Democratic Representatives.

On August 29, 2017, Secretary Mattis announced that currently serving transgender troops would be allowed to remain in the armed services, pending further study. Mattis stated he would set up a panel of experts from the Departments of Defense and Homeland Security to provide recommendations on implementing the President's policy direction. Secretary Mattis formalized the interim policy in an interim guidance issued on September 18, 2017. The interim guidance, which expires no later than February 21, 2018, essentially freezes the policies that were in place before the Presidential Memorandum of August 25. Accession of transgender individuals is still banned per the procedures dated April 28, 2010. Transgender soldiers will not be denied reenlistment, and may not be involuntarily discharged solely on the basis of their gender identity. Medical treatment will continue for service members with a gender dysphoria diagnosis, with the exception that no new sex reassignment surgeries will be permitted after March 22, 2018, unless necessary to protect the health of an individual who has already begun treatment. Mattis named the Deputy Secretary of Defense, Patrick M. Shanahan, and the Vice Chairman of the Joint Chiefs of Staff, General Paul Selva, to head the advisory panel of experts tasked with providing recommendations.

Despite the Interim Guidance, the Presidential Memorandum has attracted significant legal and legislative opposition:
 Jane Doe v. Trump, a lawsuit filed by GLAD and NCLR on August 9, 2017. A preliminary injunction against the Presidential Memorandum was granted in part on October 30, 2017, but the court vacated this injunction on January 4, 2019. (Injunctions granted by other courts remained in effect.)
 Stone v. Trump, a lawsuit filed by the ACLU of Maryland on August 28, 2017. Judge Marvin J. Garbis granted a preliminary injunction against the Presidential Memorandum in full on November 21, 2017.
 Karnoski v. Trump, a lawsuit filed by Lambda Legal on August 28, 2017. A preliminary injunction against the Presidential Memorandum was granted in full on December 11, 2017.
 Stockman v. Trump, a lawsuit filed by Equality California on September 5, 2017. A preliminary injunction against the Presidential Memorandum was granted in full on December 22, 2017.

Funding of surgical procedures 
In November 2017, the Defense Health Agency for the first time approved payment for sex reassignment surgery for an active-duty U.S. military service member. The patient, an infantry soldier who identifies as a woman, had already begun a course of treatment for gender reassignment. The procedure, which the treating doctor deemed medically necessary, was performed on November 14, 2017, at a non-military hospital, since military hospitals lacked the requisite surgical expertise.

Accession of transgender individuals
The accession of transgender individuals was scheduled to be allowed by July 1, 2017, per DTM 16-005, but military leaders asked for a one to two-year delay on accessions, stating more time was needed to review entrance standards and to ensure the success of transgender individuals. In response, Secretary Mattis issued a six-month delay on accessions. With Judge Kollar-Kotelly's decision on October 30, 2017, to enjoin the Presidential Memorandum of August 25, the accession policy reverts to the six-month delay, and the accession of transgender individuals into military service is set to begin on January 1, 2018. Because Secretary Mattis had previously delayed accession by six months in June, the United States Department of Justice Civil Division filed a motion for clarification asking if Secretary Mattis had independent authority to modify DTM 16-005. In a November 27, 2017 order, Judge Kollar-Kotelly stated "Any action by any of the Defendants that changes this status quo is preliminarily enjoined." As a named defendant, Secretary Mattis does not have authority to change the preliminary injunction order of October 30, which reverts policy to the status quo prior to the Presidential Memorandum of August 25, and accessions are set to start on January 1, 2018. On December 11, Judge Kollar-Kotelly denied the motion for partial stay, noting it took three weeks for USDOJ to file the first appeal, and that she "would have expected Defendants to act with more alacrity" if the January 1, 2018 deadline for accession was unmanageable.

USDOJ filed for emergency stays with the D.C. Circuit (on December 11, for Doe), the Fourth Circuit (on December 14, for Stone), and the Ninth Circuit (on December 15, for Karnoski), seeking to either allow Secretary Mattis to institute a second delay on accession, or narrowing the scope of the injunction to allow accession of only those individuals ruled to have standing. On December 21, 2017, a panel of three judges on the Fourth Circuit denied USDOJ's emergency motion for a stay on Judge Garbis's order. The next day, a panel of three judges on the D.C. Circuit also denied the USDOJ emergency stay motion on Judge Kollar-Kotelly's order. On December 29, USDOJ filed to withdraw their appeal from the Ninth Circuit, which was granted.

Beginning on January 1, 2018, transgender individuals were allowed to join the U.S. military if a licensed medical provider certified that the applicant completed all medical treatment associated with gender transition, has been stable in the preferred gender for 18 months, and if the applicant has completed sex reassignment or genital reconstruction surgery, that 18 months have elapsed since the most recent surgery, no functional limitations or complications persist, and no additional surgeries are required. In February 2018, the Pentagon confirmed that, for the first time, a transgender recruit had signed a contract to enter the U.S. military, joining an estimated 4,000 already serving.

Mattis recommendations and report
The Presidential Memorandum of August 25, 2017 required Defense Secretary Mattis to provide his recommendations to the President no later than February 21, 2018, but the meeting was postponed. On February 22, The Washington Post reported that Mattis was set to recommend that transgender sailors and soldiers be allowed to continue serving in the military, according to anonymous officials familiar with Mattis's plans. Also on February 22, in Karnoski v. Trump, a motion was filed to compel disclosure as prior documents filed by USDOJ stated the "'new policy' on transgender service" would be released on February 21.
 "Transgender persons with a history or diagnosis of gender dysphoria are disqualified from military service, except under the following limited circumstances:"

The memorandum providing the recommendations from Mattis, dated February 22, 2018, was released March 23 alongside the supporting report in a document filed for Karnoski v. Trump. Mattis explained he had formed "a Panel of Experts  senior uniformed and civilian Defense Department and U.S. Coast Guard leaders" to "provide its best military advice, based on increasing the lethality and readiness of America's armed forces", which authored the report attached to the Mattis memorandum. The Panel was convened on September 14, 2017, and met 13 times over a span of 90 days. The names of those on the Panel were not released, but membership was stated by role to include "the Under Secretaries of the Military Departments (or officials performing their duties), the Armed Services' Vice Chiefs (including the Vice Commandant of the U.S. Coast Guard), and the Senior Enlisted Advisors". Meetings were led "by the Under Secretary of Defense for Personnel and Readiness or an official performing those duties". That leadership post was held by Anthony Kurta during the majority of the Panel's tenure until Robert Wilkie was sworn in during November 2017. Anonymous sources stated that Vice President Mike Pence, Ryan T. Anderson (a research fellow at the Heritage Foundation and author of When Harry Became Sally: Responding to the Transgender Moment), and Tony Perkins (leader of the Family Research Council) led the creation of that report. In summary, Mattis recommended:
 "Transgender persons with a history or diagnosis of gender dysphoria are disqualified from military service, except under the following limited circumstances:
 36 consecutive months of stability "in their biological sex prior to accession"
 For currently serving personnel who are diagnosed with gender dysphoria after accession, "if they do not require a change of gender and remain deployable" they may continue to serve.
 For currently serving personnel who were diagnosed with gender dysphoria under the previous policy (outlined by Ash Carter) and prior to the effective date of the new policy, they may continue to serve "in their preferred gender and receive medically necessary treatment for gender dysphoria"
 "Transgender persons who require or have undergone gender transition are disqualified from military service."
 "Transgender persons without a history or diagnosis of gender dysphoria, who are otherwise qualified for service, may serve, like all other Service members, in their biological sex."

The Mattis memorandum criticized the prior RAND report, stating "It referred to limited and heavily caveated data to support its conclusions, glossed over the impacts of healthcare costs, readiness, and unit cohesion, and erroneously relied on the selective experiences of foreign militaries with different operational requirements than our own." However, it was also reported that unlike Trump, Mattis preferred to keep transgender people in the military.

The Department of Defense (DoD) report attached to the Mattis memorandum provides recommendations consistent with those summarized in the Mattis memorandum. For the third "limited circumstance" allowing the retention of those who began openly serving as transgender people under the Carter policy, the report concludes with the threat that "should [the Department of Defense] decision to exempt those Service members be used by a court as a basis for invalidating the entire policy, this exemption instead is and should be deemed severable from the rest of the policy", which would expel that grandfathered class of service members. One journalist called the report "an attempt to retroactively justify Trump's ban [on transgender military service] by lending it a sheen of reason and legitimacy".

The DoD report notes that DoDI 6130.03 provides "baseline accession medical standards" and touts that it "is reviewed every three to four years by the Accession Medical Standards Working Group" but later notes the "standards were consistent with DSM-III" (published in 1980) and that "[d]ue to challenges associated with updating and publishing a new iteration of DoDI 6130.03, the DoDI's terminology has not changed to reflect the changes in the DSM". The DoD report was critical of the RAND report, saying that RAND had "failed to analyze the impact at the micro level of allowing gender transition by individuals with gender dysphoria". Specifically, RAND "did not examine the potential impact on unit readiness, perceptions of fairness and equity, personnel safety, and reasonable expectations of privacy at the unit and sub-unit levels, all of which are critical to unit cohesion", did not "meaningfully address the significant mental health problems that accompany gender dysphoria", and did not address "the scope of the scientific uncertainty regarding whether gender transition treatment fully remedies those problems".

The DoD report selectively quotes DSM-5 to define gender dysphoria as "a 'marked incongruence between one's experience/expressed gender and assigned gender, of at least 6 months duration,' that is manifested in various specified ways", which omits the second component of a gender dysphoria diagnosis. According to the American Psychiatric Association, "gender dysphoria diagnosis [in adolescents and adults] involves a difference between one's experienced/expressed gender and assigned gender, and significant distress or problems functioning. It lasts at least six months and is shown by at least two of the following [list of specific symptoms]". According to the summary of DSM-5 paraphrased by the Centers for Medicare & Medicaid Services, "Gender nonconformity itself [is] not considered to be a mental disorder".

The DoD report goes on to cast doubt on the efficacy of treating gender dysphoria: "the available scientific evidence on the extent to which such treatments fully remedy all of the issues associated with gender dysphoria is unclear. Nor do any of these studies account for the added stress of military life, deployments, and combat." It cites several references to support this conclusion: a study published in 2016 by the Centers for Medicare & Medicaid Services (the "CMS" study), another published in 2011 studying the experience in Sweden (the "Swedish study"), one from Mayo Clinic researchers, and a study published in the Hayes Medical Technology Directory (the "Hayes Directory").

The scope of the CMS study was limited to determining whether a national coverage decision could be made for gender reassignment surgery. CMS did not assess specific surgery types, nor did CMS "analyze the clinical evidence for counseling or hormone therapy treatments for gender dysphoria". In an interview published in 2015, the lead author of the "Swedish study" stated "People who misuse the study always omit the fact that the study clearly states that it is not an evaluation of gender dysphoria treatment. If we look at the literature, we find that several recent studies conclude that WPATH Standards of Care compliant treatment decrease gender dysphoria and improves mental health." The Mayo Clinic study concluded that gender dysphoria treatment was effective. In a joint statement released on March 28, former Surgeons General Joycelyn Elders and David Satcher were "troubled that the Defense department's report on transgender military service has mischaracterized the robust body of peer-reviewed research on the effectiveness of transgender medical care as demonstrating 'considerable scientific uncertainty.'" A letter from American Medical Association CEO James Madara addressed to Secretary Mattis on April 3, 2018, also criticized the new policy, stating "there is no medically valid reason—including a diagnosis of gender dysphoria—to exclude
transgender individuals from military service. Transgender individuals have served, and continue to serve, our country with honor, and we believe they should be allowed to continue doing so."

The DoD report also asserts that using a person's gender identity, rather than their anatomy is inherently unfair since "sex-based standards are based on legitimate biological differences between males and females, it follows that a person's physical biology should dictate which standards apply", going on to fault the "variability and fluidity of gender transition" and providing examples such as "allowing a biological male to meet the female physical fitness and body fat standards and to compete against females in gender-specific physical training and athletic competition, [would undermine] fairness (or perceptions of fairness) because males competing as females will likely score higher on the female test than on the male test and possibly compromise safety". One study has shown that transgender female distance runners have no speed advantage over cisgender women after one year of hormone therapy.

Presidential Memorandum (March 23, 2018)

On March 23, 2018, the Trump administration issued a new memorandum stating that Mattis had recommended "transgender persons with a history or diagnosis of gender dysphoria—individuals who the policies state may require substantial medical treatment, including medications and surgery—are disqualified from military service except under certain limited circumstances." Among other declarations, the new memorandum revoked the prior memo of August 25, 2017 and authorized Secretaries Mattis and Kirstjen Nielsen to "implement any appropriate policies
concerning military service by transgender individuals".

Based on the new memorandum, in each of the four court cases (Doe, Stone, Karnoski, and Stockman), USDOJ has filed motions to dissolve the preliminary injunctions previously imposed and impose protective orders to halt discovery. The motions to dissolve the preliminary injunctions stated "this new policy [from the Mattis memorandum of February 2018], like the Carter policy before it, turns on the medical condition of gender dysphoria and contains a nuanced set of exceptions allowing some transgender individuals, including almost every Plaintiff here, to serve" and asserted "the military's new policy is constitutional", concluding that challenges to the new policy "should not be litigated under the shadow of a preliminary injunction of a Presidential Memorandum [August 2017] that is no longer in effect".

The policy was stayed in Karnoski vs. Trump (Western District of Washington) on April 13, 2018, when the court ruled that the 2018 memorandum essentially repeated the same issues as its predecessor order from 2017, that transgender service members (and transgender individuals as a class) were a protected class entitled to strict scrutiny of adverse laws (or at worst, a quasi-suspect class), and ordered that matter continue to a full trial hearing on the legality of the proposed policy.

The Trump administration, through Solicitor General Noel Francisco, has submitted petitions of writ of certiorari to the US Supreme Court in November 2018 to rule on the matter on the Karnoski, Stockman, and Doe cases prior to their final judgement, specifically seeking to reverse the stay on the order while the cases otherwise continued in their respective courts.

United States Supreme Court
On January 22, 2019, in two 5-4 orders, split along ideological lines, the US Supreme Court, denied the Trump administration's petition for expedited review of Karnoski v. Trump and Stockman v. Trump..  The Court, however, did agree to lift preliminary injunctions issued by the Karnoski and Stockman courts while legal proceedings go forward in lower courts. The injunctions had blocked the reinstatement of restrictions on military service by transgender people. However, the US Defense Department did not implement the policies set forth in the Presidential Memorandum of March 23, 2018, because the preliminary injunction issued by the federal district court in Maryland in Stone v. Trump was not considered by the Supreme Court and remains in effect. The court's five conservative justices, Chief Justice John Roberts and Justices Samuel Alito, Neil Gorsuch, Brett Kavanaugh and Clarence Thomas supported the lifting the preliminary injunctions. Mara Keisling wrote, "The Court's extraordinary action [...] is an attack on transgender people around the nation."

The ban went into effect on April 12.

Congressional testimony
In 2019, Army Capt. Alivia Stehlik, Navy Lt. Cmdr. Blake Dremann, Army Capt. Jennifer Peace, Army Staff Sgt. Patricia King and Navy Petty Officer 3rd Class Akira Wyatt became the first openly transgender members of the United States military to testify publicly in front of Congress when they testified in front of the House Armed Services Committee in support of openly transgender people serving in the military.

Transgender soldier exclusion 

Directive-type Memorandum-19-004 reinstated restrictions for transgender personnel and was signed by David L. Norquist on March 12, 2019. It came into effect April 12, 2019 and was slated to expire 11 months later.

The Trump administration policy demands adherence to sex assignment at birth as a condition for military service. Discovery of one's gender identity is a disqualifier.

The Trump administration reissued DoD Instruction 1300.28, with the new version taking effect on September 4, 2020, under the title "Military Service by Transgender Persons and Persons with Gender Dysphoria". It cancels the previous DoD Instruction of the same number, which the Obama administration had issued on October 1, 2016, under the title "In-Service Transition for Transgender Service Members".

H.Res. 124 
On March 28, 2019, the United States House of Representatives passed, with 238 yeas, 185 nays, 1 present, and 8 not voting, a non-binding resolution expressing opposition to banning service in the Armed Forces by openly transgender individuals.

On June 13, 2019, celebrating Lesbian, Gay, Bisexual and Transgender Pride Month in the Pentagon Center Courtyard, Senator Tammy Duckworth attacked Directive-type Memorandum-19-004. The Pentagon celebrated Pride Month in 2019 after not doing so in 2018.

Joe Biden administration
On Biden's first day in office on January 20, 2021, his press secretary, Jen Psaki, announced in a press conference that the President would soon reverse the government's ban on transgender people from serving openly in the military.

The ban was reversed when Biden signed the "Executive Order on Enabling All Qualified Americans to Serve Their Country in Uniform" on January 25, 2021.

Biden announced, On March 31, 2021, the Pentagon announced new policies to take effect April 30. Under the new rules, transgender servicemembers will not be at risk of involuntary discharge and can reenlist. The military will provide support for gender transitions, including medical care and a procedure to change gender marker.

Rachel Levine, assistant secretary in Health and Human Services, was appointed to full admiral on October 19, 2021, when she was sworn in to oversee the U.S. Public Health Service Commissioned Corps. She became the first woman to be a four-star admiral and the first transgender person to be a four-star officer in any uniformed service.

Demographics
Transgender people are significantly more likely to serve in the US military than the general US population. According to 2014 estimates from the Williams Institute on Sexual Orientation and Gender Identity Law and Public Policy, despite the ban on military service, about 21.4% of the total transgender population in the US is estimated to have served in the military. In May 2014, an estimated 15,500 transgender individuals served on active duty or in the Guard or Reserve forces.

About 32% of transgender individuals in the US who are assigned male at birth serve or have served in the military, compared to 5.5% for transgender individuals who are assigned female at birth. According to the 2014 study, "[t]he American military employs more transgender people than any other organisation in the world: around 15,500...more than 6,000 of whom are on active duty."

A 2016 workplace and gender relations survey found 9,000 US military service members consider themselves transgender individuals. In 2019, the United States Department of Defense states that 1,400 service members have been diagnosed with gender dysphoria and fewer than 10 service members were receiving gender reassignment surgery.

Discharges

The military did not record statistics for the number of transgender individuals discharged. In April 2015, the Palm Center stated that at least a dozen individuals had been discharged in the past six months for being transgender.

Veterans

 Calpernia Addams
 Kristin Beck
 Albert Cashier
 Mary Elizabeth Clark
 Joanne Conte
 Felicia Elizondo
 Fallon Fox
 Sage Fox
 Phyllis Frye
 Deborah Hartin
 Monica Helms
 Christine Jorgensen
 Janae Kroc
 Chelsea Manning
 Shane Ortega
 Jennifer Pritzker
 Renée Richards
 Angelica Ross
 Autumn Sandeen
 Lauren Scott
 Sheri Swokowski

See also
 Transgender people and military service
 Transgender American Veterans Association
 Intersex people in the United States military
 Bibliography of works on the United States military and LGBT+ topics#Transgenderism
 Sexual orientation and gender identity in the United States military

Notes

References

External links
 Palm Center – University of California, Santa Barbara – scholarly research institute which has published many studies on transgender personnel in the military.
 Transgender American Veterans Association
 
 
 Kavanaugh Smacks Down Transgenders in the Military 
 SPARTA A Transgender Military Advocacy Organization

LGBT law in the United States
LGBT rights in the United States
Transgender history in the United States
History of LGBT civil rights in the United States
Policies of Donald Trump
Transgender law in the United States
Transgender people and the United States military